Wolfgang Gust (born 9 April 1935 in Hanover) is a German journalist, historian, author and chief of heading for magazine Der Spiegel.

He studied Romanistik in Freiburg, Bonn and Toulouse (France) and marketing and management in Hamburg. He worked at Der Spiegel starting in 1965, first as editor of economics and then as a foreign editor. At the beginning of 1970 he went to Paris as chief correspondent, and became deputy foreign editor in 1977. In 1981 he directed the department of books. He was the author of the series on Mountainous Karabagh and the Armenian genocide. After 1993 he became a freelance journalist and author.

Gust examined the publication by Protestant minister Johannes Lepsius of documents of the German foreign office related to Armenian genocide and disclosed various omissions and falsifications that covered for German responsibility. He published the wording of the original documents, including English translation, as well as the individual manipulations in armenocide.net in co-operation with its wife in March 2000. Three years later, he published hundreds of further German Auswärtiges Amt documents in the same portal. In 2005 he published a selection of the most important documents.

Wolfgang Gust has received the Garbis Papazian prize, given to support non-Armenians who contribute to the propagation of Armenian causes.

References

Works
 Der Völkermord an den Armeniern: Die Tragödie des ältesten Christenvolks der Welt. Hanser Verlag, 1993, .
 Das Imperium der Sultane. Eine Geschichte des Osmanischen Reichs. Carl Hanser Verlag, München 1995 .
 Der Völkermord an den Armeniern 1915/16. Dokumente aus dem Politischen Archiv des deutschen Auswärtigen Amts, Verlag zu Klampen, 2005, .

External links
 
armenocide.de - Documentation from archives of the German foreign office about the Armenian Genocide

Living people
20th-century German historians
1935 births
German male non-fiction writers
Der Spiegel people